There are several people with the surname Megerle von Mühlfeld:

 Johann Baptist Megerle von Mühlfeld
 Johann Carl Megerle von Mühlfeld (1765-1840), curator of insects, especially beetles, in Vienna.
 Johann Georg Megerle von Mühlfeld (1780-1831), younger son of Johann Baptist.
 Eugen Alexander Megerle von Mühlfeld (1810-1868) was the dean of the faculty of law at the University of Vienna since 1848
 Therese Megerle von Mühlfeld (1813 in Pressburg, Austria-Hungary -1865) was an author and dramatist.